The 2008–09 season was Real Madrid Club de Fútbol's 78th season in La Liga. This article lists all matches that the club played in the 2008–09 season and shows statistics of the club's players.

Players

Squad information

In

Total spending:  €71.7 million

Out

Total income:  €69.7 million

Club

Coaching staff

Kits

|
| 
|

Other information

Competitions

La Liga

League table

Results by round

Matches

Copa del Rey

Champions League

Group H

Round of 16

Supercopa de España

Friendlies

Statistics

Players statistics

Long-term injury list

Last updated: 2009-06-01
Source: Realmadrid.com

Suspension list

Last updated: 2009-06-01
Source: Realmadrid.com

Disciplinary record

.

Start formations

It should be pointed out that Real is neither playing 4–3–3 nor 4–4–2, but a hybrid formation between both.

See also
2008–09 La Liga
2008–09 Copa del Rey
2008 Supercopa de España
2008–09 UEFA Champions League

References

Real Madrid
Real Madrid CF seasons